The BMW X5 M (F85) is a mid-size luxury SUV that is based on the BMW X5 (F15) which has been built by BMW since 2014. Unlike the BMW X5 M50d the X5 M is a full BMW M series car that has the M Powered engine. In comparison, the M50d is classified as an "M Performance Car" which means it isn't a full M car unlike the BMW M3 or the BMW M5.

The engine has M TwinPower Turbo and Valvetronic technologies, to deliver a 0– time of 4.2 seconds.

An M-tuned xDrive all-wheel drive system provides traction. It distributes drive between the front and rear axles, while Dynamic Performance Control distributes torque between the 21-inch M Double-spoke light-alloy wheels—all for dynamic driving and all-road capability.

Successor 

In June 2018, BMW announced the BMW X5 (G05) which is the successor to the BMW X5 (F15), the X5 M (F85) successor is named F95, it was expected to be G85 but interestingly BMW used F95.

References

See also 

 BMW
 BMW M
 BMW X5 (F15)
 BMW X5 (G05)
 BMW X6 (F16)

X5
F85
Cars introduced in 2013
Mid-size sport utility vehicles
Luxury sport utility vehicles
Plug-in hybrid vehicles